The Boppers are a Swedish band formed in 1977 who found fame with cover versions of 1950s and 1960s songs.

History
The band was formed by two brothers, Michel and Peter Jezewski (then 22 and 20 years old) and Ville and Ingemar Wallén (then 19 and 22 years old respectively), as well as their friends Mats Lagerwall (then 20 years old) and Lasse Westerberg (then 18 years old). They soon got a large number of gigs. Their debut album Number 1 in 1978 was originally only a minor, but went on to become one of the best-selling albums in Sweden, selling over 420,000 copies. They gained mainstream success in 1979 with their second album Keep On Boppin', which topped the charts and has sold a similar number of copies. At the same time, the group slimmed down and got their standard line-up in Ingemar Wallén (vocals, guitar), Mats Lagerwall (vocals, guitar), Peter Jezewski (vocals, bass) and Ville Wallén (vocals, drums).

Already from the second album, the Boppers started touring around the world. Their album was even released in Spanish and they had some success in Japan, where one of their albums, Live 'n' roll, was recorded there in 1981. However, soon Wallén left and was replaced by Kenneth Björnlundh, who has been performing with them since. The group's popularity waned in the mid-1980s . The album Black Label, which came out in 1983, for example, did not sell very well. Jezewski tried his hand at a solo career in the mid-1980s, but did not find success.

However, the band returned to the limelight largely due to Jerry Williams. The Boppers performed at Williams' successful concert at the Hamburger Börs and accompanied him on his tour of Sweden in the late 1980s.  The band made a new record deal with Sonet and had a hit in 1991 with the song "Jeannie's Coming Back " and have since released several records. Their last album, Great Kicks, was released in 2017 on Warner Music.

In 1993, Peter Jezewski left the band shortly after the release of the album Tempted, to pursue his own solo career. In 2001, the Boppers got an unexpected collaboration in Markoolio whom they met on a tour. They recorded the song "Rocka på" together, and got their first big hit since "Jeannie's Coming Back". With the help of Markoolio's more youthful audience, the group gained more record buyers and a new wave of success. In 2002, all the original members, Ville Wallén, Mats Lagerwall, Ingmar Wallén, Peter Jezewski and Lasse Westerberg, were reunited in the television program Bingolotto. In the autumn of 2003, the Boppers played in the show Jerka at Stora Teatern, Gothenburg together with Jerry Williams.

Drummer Ville Wallén passed away on 26 November 2003.

Discography

Albums

Studio albums

Live albums

Compilation albums

Video albums

EPs

Singles

References

1977 establishments in Sweden
English-language singers from Sweden
Musical groups established in 1977
Musical groups from Stockholm
Swedish rock music groups
Swedish-language singers